Abdul Ganiyu or Abdul-Ganiyu may refer to:

Abdul Ganiyu Agbaje (born 1925), justice of the Nigeria Supreme Court
Abdul Ganiyu Ambali (born 1957), Nigerian academic, university administrator
Abdul Ganiyu Salami (born 1942), Nigerian and Ghanaian footballer.
Ismail Abdul-Ganiyu (born 1996), Ghanaian footballer

See also
Ganiyu
Abdul Ghani / Abdelghani